Daniel Matthew Mustapic (born 23 August 1960) is a New Zealand curler from Dunedin. He is a two-time  and a four-time New Zealand men's champion (2003, 2005, 2006, 2012).

He participated in the 2006 Winter Olympics, where the New Zealand men's team finished in tenth place.

Prior to emigrating to New Zealand, Mustapic was active in the Ontario curling scene. While living in Hamilton and curling out of Kitchener, he won the 1994 Welton Beauchamp Classic.

Teams

Men's

Mixed doubles

References

External links
 

1960 births
Living people
New Zealand male curlers
Olympic curlers of New Zealand
Curlers at the 2006 Winter Olympics
Pacific-Asian curling champions
New Zealand curling champions
Canadian emigrants to New Zealand
Curlers from Hamilton, Ontario
Curlers from Thunder Bay
Sportspeople from Dunedin
20th-century New Zealand people